Fernando Toro (born January 31, 1941, in Santiago, Chile) is a retired American Thoroughbred horse racing jockey about whom Santa Anita Park called one of Southern California's most successful jockeys in the 1970s and '80s.

On November 19, 1956, Fernando Toro won the first race of his riding career at the Club Hípico de Santiago in Santiago, Chile. He was the leading rider in Chile when he decided to emigrate to the United States in 1966 where he would retire from riding in 1990 having won 3,555 North American races.
In 1975 Fernando Toro was voted the George Woolf Memorial Jockey Award. The award has been given annually since 1950 to a thoroughbred horse racing jockey in North America who demonstrates high standards of personal and professional conduct both on and off the racetrack.

Widely respected for his expertise in turf races, among his many successes Fernando Toro rode the filly Royal Heroine to victory in the 1984 inaugural running of the Breeders' Cup Mile.

References

1941 births
Living people
American jockeys
Chilean jockeys
Sportspeople from Santiago
Chilean emigrants to the United States
Sportspeople from California